Cursive/Small Brown Bike Split is a split album between Cursive and Small Brown Bike. It was released in March 2001 on Makoto Recordings. The 7" was pressed on lime green vinyl that matched the cover and was limited to 2,000 copies. The Cursive song "Nostalgia" later made its way onto their compilation, The Difference Between Houses and Homes.

Track listing
 Small Brown Bike - "My Unanswered Whys"
 Cursive - "Nostalgia"

References 

Cursive (band) songs
2001 EPs
Split EPs